Sheny Oralia Vega Recinos (born 6 June 1989) is a Guatemalan retired footballer who played as a forward. She has been a member of the Guatemala women's national team.

International career
Vega capped for Guatemala at senior level during the 2010 CONCACAF Women's World Cup Qualifying, the 2010 Central American and Caribbean Games and the 2012 CONCACAF Women's Olympic Qualifying Tournament qualification.

References

1989 births
Living people
Guatemalan women's footballers
Guatemala women's international footballers
Women's association football forwards